Nazarene is a title used to describe people from the city of Nazareth in the New Testament (there is no mention of either Nazareth or Nazarene in the Old Testament), and is a title applied to Jesus, who, according to the New Testament, grew up in Nazareth, a town in Galilee, now in northern Israel. The phrases traditionally rendered as "Jesus of Nazareth" can also be translated as "Jesus the Nazarene" or "Jesus the Nazorean", and the title Nazarene may have a religious significance instead of denoting a place of origin. Both Nazarene and Nazorean are irregular in Greek and the additional vowel in Nazorean complicates any derivation from Nazareth.

The Gospel of Matthew explains that the title Nazarene is derived from the prophecy "He will be called a Nazorean", but this has no obvious Old Testament source. Some scholars argue that it refers to a passage in the Book of Isaiah, with Nazarene a Greek reading of the Hebrew  ('branch'), understood as a messianic title. Others point to a passage in the Book of Judges which refers to Samson as a Nazirite, a word that is just one letter off from Nazarene in Greek. It is also possible that Nazorean signs Jesus as a ruler.

The Greek New Testament uses Nazarene six times (Mark, Luke), while Nazorean is used 13 times (Matthew, Mark in some manuscripts, Luke, John, Acts). In the Book of Acts, Nazorean is used to refer to a follower of Jesus, i.e. a Christian, rather than an inhabitant of a town.  is the modern Hebrew word for Christians and one of two words commonly used to mean 'Christian' in Syriac (Nasrani) and Arabic.

Etymology
Nazarene is anglicized from Greek , a word applied to Jesus in the New Testament. Several Hebrew words have been suggested as roots:

Nazareth

The traditional view is that this word's derived from the Hebrew word for Nazareth that was used in ancient times.

The common Greek structure  'Jesus the Nazarene/of Nazareth' is traditionally considered as one of several geographical names in the New Testament such as  'Lucius the Cyrenian/Lucius of Cyrene,'  ('Trophimus the Ephesian'),  ('Mary the woman of Magdala'),  ('Saul the Tarsian'), or many classical examples such as Athenagoras the Athenian.

The Greek phrase usually translated as Jesus of Nazareth can be compared with three other places in the New Testament where the construction of Nazareth is used:

 
Jesus is also referred to as "from Nazareth of Galilee":

Similar is found in :

Some consider Jesus the Nazarene more common in the Greek. The name "of Nazareth" is not used of anyone else, and outside the New Testament there is no reference to Nazareth.

Nazareth and Nazarene are complementary only in Greek, where they possess the "z", or voiced alveolar fricative. In Semitic languages, Nazarene and its cognates Nazareth, Nazara, and Nazorean/Nazaraean possess the voiceless alveolar fricative corresponding to the "s" or "ts" sound. Voiced and voiceless sounds follow separate linguistic pathways. The additional vowel in Nazorean makes this variation more difficult to derive, although a weak Aramaic vowel in Nazareth has been suggested as a possible source.

(n-ts-r), pronounced nay'·tser, meaning 'branch', 'flower', or 'offshoot'. (See below.)

The text from Isaiah is:

In ancient Hebrew texts, vowels were not indicated, so a wider variety of readings was possible in Jerome's time. Here branch/Nazarene is metaphorically "descendant" (of Jesse, father of King David). Eusebius, a 4th-century Christian polemicist, also argued that Isaiah was the source of Nazarene. This prophecy by Isaiah was extremely popular in New Testament times and is also referred to in Romans and Revelation.

Ancient usage
The term Nazarene (Nazorean or Nazaraean) has been referred to in the Jewish Gospels, particularly the Hebrew Gospel, the Gospel of the Nazarenes and the Gospel of Matthew. It is also referred to in the Gospel of Mark.

Matthew
Matthew consistently uses the variant Nazorean. A link between Nazorean and Nazareth is found in Matthew:

The passage presents difficulties; no prophecy such as "He shall be called a Nazorean" is known in Jewish scripture, and Nazorean is a new term, appearing here for the first time in association with Nazareth and, indeed, for the first time anywhere.

Matthew's prophecy is often linked to Isaiah's. Matthew's phrase "spoken through the prophets" may suggest that these passages are being referred to collectively. In contrast, the phrase "through the prophet," used a few verses above the Nazorean prophecy, refers to a specific Old Testament passage.

An alternative view suggests that a passage in the Book of Judges which refers to Samson as a Nazirite is the source for Matthew's prophecy. Nazirite is only one letter off from Nazorean in Greek. But the characterization of Jesus in the New Testament is not that of a typical Nazirite, and it is doubtful that Matthew intended a comparison between Jesus and the amoral Samson. But Nazorean can be a transliteration of the NZR, which also means 'ruler' (s. Gen 49,26), referring to Jesus as the new ruler of Israel.

Mark

The Gospel of Mark, considered the oldest gospel, consistently uses Nazarene, while scripture written later generally uses Nazorean. This suggests that the form more closely tied to Nazareth came first. Another possibility is that Mark used this form because the more explicitly messianic form was still controversial when he was writing. Before he was baptized, Mark refers to Jesus as "from Nazareth of Galilee," whereas afterwards he is "the Nazarene". In a similar fashion, second century messianic claimant Simon bar Kokhba (Aramaic for 'Simon, son of a star'), changed his name from Simon bar Kosiba to add a reference to the Star Prophecy.

Patristic works
After Tertullus (Acts 24:5), the second reference to Nazarenes (plural) comes from Tertullian (208), the third reference from Eusebius (before 324), then extensive references in Epiphanius of Salamis (375) and Jerome (circa 390).

Epiphanius additionally is the first and only source to write of another group with a similar name, the "Nasarenes" of Gilead and Bashan in Trans-Jordan (Greek:  Panarion 18). Epiphanius clearly distinguishes this group from the Christian Nazarenes as a separate and different "pre-Christian" Jewish sect. Epiphanius' explanation is dismissed as a confusion by some scholars (Schoeps 1911, Schaeder 1942, Gaertner 1957), or a misidentification (Bugge). Other scholars have seen some truth in Epiphanius' explanation and variously identified such a group with the Mandeans, Samaritans, or Rechabites.

Gnostic works
The Gospel of Philip, a third-century Gnostic work, claims that the word Nazarene signifies 'the truth':

Historicity
Although the historian Flavius Josephus (AD 37 – c. 100) mentions 45 towns in Galilee, he never mentions Nazareth. But Josephus also writes that Galilee had 219 villages in all, so it is clear that most village names have gone unrecorded in surviving literature. Nazareth was overshadowed by nearby Japhia in his time, so Josephus might not have thought of it as a separate town. The earliest known reference to Nazareth outside the New Testament and as a contemporary town is by Sextus Julius Africanus, who wrote around AD 200. Writers who question the association of Nazareth with the life of Jesus suggest that Nazorean was originally a religious title and was later reinterpreted as referring to a town.

Variants
The numbers in parenthesis are from Strong's Concordance.

Nazarene (3479)
 , 
 
 
 ,

Nazorean (3480)
 Matthew 2:23, 
 

Nazareth (3478)
 Matthew 4:13, 
 , Matthew 2:23,

Nazarenes – a term for the early Christians
The first confirmed use of Nazarenes (in Greek Nazoraioi) occurs from Tertullus before Antonius Felix.

Nazarenes for Christians in Greek
In Acts, Paul the Apostle is called "a ringleader of the sect of the Nazoreans", thus identifying Nazorean with Christian. Although both Christianios (by Gentiles) and Nazarenes (by Jews) appear to have been current in the 1st century, and both are recorded in the New Testament, the Gentile name Christian appears to have won out against Nazarene in usage among Christians themselves after the 1st century. Around 331 Eusebius records that from the name Nazareth Christ was called a Nazoraean, and that in earlier centuries Christians, were once called Nazarenes. Tertullian (Against Marcion 4:8) records that "for this reason the Jews call us 'Nazarenes'. The first mention of the term Nazarenes (plural) is that of Tertullus in the first accusation of Paul, though Herod Agrippa II (Acts 26:28) uses the term Christians, which had been "first used in Antioch." (Acts 11:26), and is acknowledged in 1 Peter 4:16. Later Tertullian, Jerome, Origen and Eusebius note that the Jews call Christians Nazarenes.

Nazarenes or Nasranis for Christians in Aramaic and Syriac

Likewise "but if as a Christian, let him not be ashamed, but glorify God in this name" (1 Peter 4:16), and early Syriac church texts.

However, in the statement of Tertullus in Acts 24:5, Nazarenes and in Jesus of Nazareth are both  in Syrian Aramaic, while  is used for Nazareth. This usage may explain transmission of the name Nasorean as the name of the Mandaeans leaving Jerusalem for Iraq in the Haran Gawaita of the Mandaeans. Saint Thomas Christians, an ancient community in India who claim to trace their origins to evangelistic activity of Thomas the Apostle in the 1st century, are sometimes known by the name Nasrani even today.

Nazarenes as Christians in Arabic literature
The term  is used many times in the Qur'an when referring to them. For example, Surat Al-Baqara (Verse No. 113) says:

Nazarenes as Christians in Hebrew literature
In Rabbinic and contemporary Israeli modern Hebrew, the term  (plural), or singular  is the general official term for 'Christians' and 'Christian', although many Christians prefer  'Messianics', as found in most Hebrew New Testament translations and used to translate the Greek  in many translations of the New Testament into Hebrew, and by some churches.

Nazarene and Nazarenes in the Talmud
 Avodah Zarah ('foreign worship') 6a: "The Nazarene day, according to the words of R. Ishmael, is forbidden for ever"
 Taanit 'On fasting' 27b: "Why did they not fast on the day after the Sabbath? Rabbi Johanan said, because of the "

References by Tannaim (70-200 CE) and Amoraim (230-500 CE) to Minim are much more common, leading some, such as R. Travers Herford (1903), to conclude that  in Talmud and Midrash generally refers to Jewish Christians.

This includes passages in the Babylonian Talmud such as Sanhedrin 107b which states "Jesus the Nazarene practiced magic and led Israel astray" though scholars such as Bock (2002) consider the historicity of the event described is questionable. The Jerusalem Talmud contains other coded references to Jesus such as "Jesus ben Pantera," while the references using the term  are restricted to the Babylon Talmud. Pritz, following Dussaud, connects Pliny's 1st century BCE Nazerini, to the 9th century CE Nusairis.

Nazarenes, and Ephanius'  (4th century CE)

The testimonies of Epiphanius, Philastrius, and Pseudo-Tertullian may all draw in part from the same lost anti-heretical works of Hippolytus of Rome, mentioned as the Syntagma by Photius, and Against all Heresies by Origen and Jerome.

Epiphanius uses the spelling , which he attempts to distinguish from the spelling  in parts of the New Testament, as a Jewish-Christian sect. According to the testimony of Epiphanius against the 4th-century Nazarenes, he reports them as having pre-Christian origins. He writes: "(6,1) They did not call themselves Nasaraeans either; the Nasaraean sect was before Christ, and did not know Christ. 6,2 But besides, as I indicated, everyone called the Christians Nazoraeans," (Adversus Haereses, 29.6). The sect was apparently centered in the areas of Coele-Syria, Galilee and Samaria, essentially corresponding to the long-defunct Kingdom of Israel. According to Epiphanius they rejected temple sacrifice and the Law of Moses, but adhered to other Jewish practices. They are described as being vegetarian. According to him they were Jews only by nationality who lived in Gilead, Basham, and the Transjordan. They revered Moses but, unlike the pro-Torah Nazoraeans, believed he had received different laws from those accredited to him.

Epiphanius' testimony was accepted as accurate by some 19th-century scholars, including Wilhelm Bousset, Richard Reitzenstein and Bultmann. However Epiphanius testimony in this regard, which is second-hand, is in modern scholarship read with more awareness of his polemical objectives to show that the 4th century Nazarenes and Ebionites were not Christian.

Mandaeans

The Mandaeans of Iraq and Iran use the term Nasoraean in their scroll, the Haran Gawaitha, to describe their origins in, and migration from Jerusalem: "And sixty thousand Nasoraeans abandoned the Sign of the Seven and entered the Median Hills, a place where we were free from domination by all other races."...

Theories on the origins of the Mandaeans have varied widely. During the 19th century Wilhelm Bousset, Richard Reitzenstein and Rudolf Bultmann argued that the Mandaeans were pre-Christian, as a parallel of Bultmann's theory that Gnosticism predated the Gospel of John. Hans Lietzmann (1930) countered with the argument that all extant texts could be explained by a 7th-century exposure to, and conversion to, an oriental form of Christianity, taking on such Christian rituals as a Sunday Sabbath. Mandaean lead amulets have been dated to as early as the 3rd Century CE and the first confirmed Mandaean scribe using colophons copied the Left Ginza around the year 200 CE. 

Scholars of Mandaeans considered them to be of pre-Christian origin. They claim John the Baptist as a member (and onetime leader) of their sect; the River Jordan is a central feature of their doctrine of baptism.

See also 
 Ebionites
 Jesuism
 Jewish Christians
 Kabbalists
 Ophites
 Yesseus Mazareus Yessedekeus in Sethianism

References

Further reading
 Berghorn, M., Die Genesis Jesu Christi aber war so. Die Herkunft Jesu nach dem matthäischen Prolog (Mt 1,1-4,16), Göttingen 2019.  
 Drower, E. S., The Secret Adam: A Study of Nasoraean Gnosis, Clarendon Press, Oxford (1960)
 The Ante-Nicene Fathers (1986 American Edition), vol. viii, Wm. B. Eerdmans Publ. Co., Grand Rapids, Michigan.

Christian terminology
Early Christianity and Judaism
New Testament words and phrases
Nazareth